The Magic City is the second and final studio album from American indie rock band Helium. It was released in 1997 on Matador Records.

Production
The album was produced at Mitch Easter's Fidelitorium studio, in North Carolina. It was recorded in six weeks. Its sound was influenced by psychedelic and progressive rock.

Critical reception
AllMusic called the album "a rich, colorful array of sounds ... that blends lo-fi indie-rock with '70s prog rock." Magnet wrote: "The album is a Pet Sounds chamber-pop-meets-progressive-rock indie masterpiece, created long before any lo-fi-loving cretin would ever admit to loving Yes’ Close To The Edge, Genesis’ Nursery Cryme or watching Keith Emerson throw daggers into his eight-foot-high synthesizer." New York Magazine praised Timony's "loopy, pensive guitar lines, deceptively offbeat song structures, and quirky vocal style."

Track listing

Personnel
Mary Timony - Guitar, Vocals, Chamberlin, Keyboards
Ash Bowie - Bass, Drums
Shawn King Devlin - Drums
Mitch Easter - Guitar, Mandolin, Percussion, Pedal Steel, Vocals (background), Producer, Engineer, Slide Guitar, Mixing
Andrew Emmett - Violin
Ken Wilmot - Trumpet
Chris Stamey - Editing, Pro-Tools

References

1997 albums
Albums produced by Mitch Easter
Helium (band) albums
Matador Records albums